Jesse Kerrison (born 3 April 1994) is an Australian former professional cyclist.

Major results

2011
 2nd Road race, National Junior Road Championships
2013
 4th Overall Tour of Taihu Lake
1st  Young rider classification
1st Stage 6
 4th Tour of Nanjing
2014
 1st Tour of Yancheng Coastal Wetlands
 1st Stage 1 Tour of Taihu Lake
 8th Road race, Oceania Under-23 Road Championships
2015
 3rd Criterium, National Under-23 Road Championships
2016
 1st  Criterium, National Under-23 Road Championships
 1st Stage 1 Tour de Kumano

References

External links

1994 births
Living people
Australian male cyclists